La vecindad may refer to:
the setting of El Chavo del Ocho
La vecindad (telenovela)